National Tertiary Route 718, or just Route 718 (or ) is a National Road Route of Costa Rica, located in the Alajuela province.

Description
In Alajuela province the route covers Alajuela canton (San Isidro, Tambor districts).

References

Highways in Costa Rica